The Mérida Open, also known as Mérida Open Akron for sponsorship reasons, is a women's tennis event held in Mérida, Mexico. The first edition took place in February 2023. Mérida Open is part of the WTA Tour and is listed as a WTA 250 tournament. The tournament was introduced in 2023 as a replacement for Abierto Zapopan.

The tournament is held at the Yucatán Country Club on outdoor hardcourts.

The tournament is sponsored by Akron, a Mexican automotive products company, and has no connection with the city of Akron, Ohio.

Past finals

Singles

Doubles

See also
 Abierto Zapopan
 Guadalajara Open Akron
 Monterrey Open
 Abierto Mexicano Telcel
 Los Cabos Open

References

WTA Tour
Tennis tournaments in Mexico
Hard court tennis tournaments